is a Japanese film director. He is most famous for his collaborations with the actor Yūsaku Matsuda in both film and television.

Filmography
Mottomo Kiken na Yugi
Satsujin Yugi
Shokei Yugi
The Resurrection of the Golden Wolf (1979)
The Beast To Die (1980)
 Lucky 13 (Li ti Shi san mei , 1986)
Best Guy (1990)
Saraba Abunai Deka (2016)

Television
Daitokai (1976-79)
Daitsuiseki (1978) (ep. 3, 4, 7, 8, 13, 14, 26)
Tantei Monogatari (ep. 1, 2, 15, 16, 20, 21)
Seibu Keisatsu series 
Shōgun no Onmitsu! Kage Jūhachi (1986)
Seibu Keisatsu Special (2004)

References

External links

Japanese film directors
Japanese television directors
1937 births
Living people
People from Yamagata Prefecture